The Småkovane Cirques are two cirques, separated by a narrow ridge, indenting the northeast side of Breplogen Mountain in the Mühlig-Hofmann Mountains of Queen Maud Land. They were plotted from surveys and air photos by the Norwegian Antarctic Expedition (1956–60) and named Småkovane ("the small closets").

References

Cirques of Queen Maud Land
Princess Astrid Coast